Yaroslav Zakharevych (born 24 September 1989 in Kyiv, Ukrainian SSR, Soviet Union) is a professional Ukrainian football midfielder who plays for Nyva Buzova.

Career
He played for FC Nyva Ternopil and for FC Obolon Kyiv which dissolved itself in February 2013.

References

External links
 
 Information and photo of Yaroslav Zakharevych at arsenal-kiev.com.ua
 Official Website Profile
 

1989 births
Living people
Footballers from Kyiv
Ukrainian footballers
FC Arsenal Kyiv players
Ukrainian Premier League players
Ukrainian First League players
Ukrainian Second League players
FC Nyva Ternopil players
FC Kryvbas Kryvyi Rih players
FC Obolon-Brovar Kyiv players
FC Obolon-2 Kyiv players
FC Cherkashchyna players
FC Arsenal-Kyivshchyna Bila Tserkva players
PFC Sumy players
FC Polissya Zhytomyr players
FC Balkany Zorya players
Association football midfielders